Burnt Out is a 2005 French drama film directed by Fabienne Godet.

Cast 
 Olivier Gourmet - François Durrieux
 Dominique Blanc - Clémence Durrieux
 Julie Depardieu - Flora
 Marion Cotillard - Lisa
 Jeffrey Barbeau - Benjamin Durrieux
 Jean-Michel Portal - Simon Lacaze
 Jean-Marie Winling - Bruner
 Pascal Elso - Marc
 François Levantal - Jean
 Martine Chevallier - Julie

References

External links 

2005 drama films
2005 films
French drama films
2000s French-language films
Films scored by Dario Marianelli
2000s French films